Raffaele Mezzenga is a soft condensed matter scientist, currently heading the Laboratory of Food and Soft Materials at the Swiss Federal Institute of Technology in Zurich.

Education
Prof. Mezzenga received his M.S. in Materials Science (1997) from Perugia University in Italy, while actively working for the European Center for Nuclear Research (CERN) and NASA (NASA Space Shuttle Discovery mission STS91), followed by a PhD in the field of Polymer Physics at the Swiss Federal Institute of Technology, Lausanne, Switzerland (2001).

Research and career
Mezzenga did postdoctoral research on semiconductive polymer colloids at the University of California Santa Barbara (UCSB) and then moved to the Nestlé Research Center in Lausanne as research scientist, working on the self-assembly of surfactants, natural amphiphiles and lyotropic liquid crystals. In 2005 he was hired as Associate Professor in the Physics Department of the University of Fribourg, and he then joined ETH Zurich on 2009 as Full Professor.

His research mainly focuses on the fundamental understanding of self-assembly processes in polymers, lyotropic liquid crystals, biological and food colloidal systems. His work has led to over 400 scientific publications and about 20 patents. He has made seminal contributions to several fields of soft condensed matter such as in protein aggregation, biopolymers and surfactants self-organisation. He has pioneered the use of protein-based materials in the establishment of new technologies for environmental remediation, health and advanced materials design.

Awards and honours
Prof. Mezzenga was the recipient of the 2011 John H. Dillon Medal by the American Physical Society. He was elected Fellow of the American Physical Society in 2017. Other awards include the 2011 Young Scientist Research Award of the American Oil Chemist Society, the 2013 Biomacromolecules/Macromolecules Young Investigator Award of the American Chemical Society and the 2019 Spark Award for the most promising ETH Zurich invention in 2019.

Mezzenga served as an Executive, Associate and Guest Editor for various journals including Food Biophysics, Food Hydrocolloids, Polymer International, Trends in Food Science, and has been a board member of Swiss Chemical Society for over 15 years.

External links

References

Fellows of the American Physical Society
ETH Zurich
University of Perugia